Shaleise Law (born 24 July 1998) is an Australian rules footballer who last played for the Brisbane Lions in the AFL Women's.

Early life
Law was born in 1998 in Townsville, Queensland. She was playing for Zillmere when she was drafted.

AFLW career
She made her debut in the Lions' inaugural game against  at Casey Fields on 5 February 2017.

Law was delisted by Brisbane at the end of the 2017 season.

References

External links

1998 births
Living people
Sportspeople from Townsville
Sportswomen from Queensland
Australian rules footballers from Queensland
Brisbane Lions (AFLW) players
Indigenous Australian players of Australian rules football